Clube Oriental de Lisboa is a Portuguese football club based in Lisbon. Founded in 1946, it currently competes in the Campeonato de Portugal, holding home games at Campo Engenheiro Carlos Salema, with an 8,500 capacity.

History
Clube Oriental de Lisboa was founded on 8 August 1946 by the merger of three clubs: Grupo Desportivo Os Fósforos, Marvilense Futebol Clube, and Chelas Futebol Clube.

Rui de Seixas, then-president of Chelas Football Club, in an interview with The Sports in January 1936, first raised the idea of a single club that encompasses the entire eastern part of the head. But many were the critics who lashed the most prestigious leader causing him to give up the idea almost immediately. Still, days later, José Marques de Oliveira returns to the charge but your interview is simply ignored.

In support of parochial ambitions and rivalries almost sick for a few more years Chelas, Marvilense Matches and battle it out in real battles "in search of fleeting glory. Lisbon lived quietly in their depression, as the war spread throughout the world.

It is then, in late April 1946, the billiards room Coffee Ice, Arthur Ines scribe prestigious newspaper "Republic", is asked by José Marques de Oliveira, former vice president of Chelas said:
If you wanted to could make a great sports club in Lisbon ... Something with such incredulous words, Agnes Arthur replied: He guaranteed that no environment for a merger between the clubs? Absolutely. The elements of the three clubs want it. – Said José Marques de Oliveira.

Having then been introduced to some distinguished leaders of the three clubs, such as Rui de Seixas and others, publishes an opinion piece not signing in May 1946, but has the power to shake everyone's Marvila, Beato, Xabregas Well and Poço Bispo.

On 13 July 1946, Arthur Ines, visibly moved by the unfolding of events written in the pages of his "Republic":
"We can guarantee that almost all the mass of the three associative friendly and valuable clubs, Chelas, Marvilense Matches and is excited about the idea of the merger. Likewise the leaders of the most prestigious of the communities concerned, except Mr. John Rose, president of Chelas also give its approval to the idea that needs to be properly studied and understood.

A large sports club in the area east of the city, able to impose himself in sport in the country, with its 5,000 members – minimum calculated – and all face today is an established idea that dominates the hard-working population of the area. That this is so is proved by the great enthusiasm already raging among members of the Chelas Futebol Clube, Marvilense Futebol Clube and Grupo Desportivo "Os Fósforos".

8 August 1946: Clube Oriental de Lisboa is born. Hundreds of athletes, club members who have joined to form a major new sports body of the eastern part of Lisbon appeared full of faith and enthusiasm at the headquarters of the former Marvilense, to vote the basis of the statutes of the great Lisbon club was born that day.

The vast hall of the former Marvilense Football Club was small to accommodate the hundreds of people – members of three clubs households – who wanted to attend the meeting magna to the foundation of the Clube Oriental de Lisboa. In the broad frontier of the building, a considerable crowd went hand in hand all the meeting through loudspeakers for this purpose.

Oriental was one of the founders of the new Campeonato Nacional de Seniores in 2013. At the end of the season they won first place in their promotion group, returning to the Portuguese second tier for the first time since 1989, when the tier was unified after years of being regionalized.

League and cup history

Last updated: 25 May 2013
Ti. = Tier; 1D = Portuguese League; 2H = Liga de Honra; 2DS/2D = Segunda Divisão
3DS = Terceira Divisão; 5DS = AF Aveiro First Division
Pos. = Position; Pl = Match played; W = Win; D = Draw; L = Lost; GS = Goal scored; GA = Goal against; P = Points

Current squad

References

External links
Official site 

 
Football clubs in Portugal
Sport in Lisbon
Association football clubs established in 1946
1946 establishments in Portugal
Primeira Liga clubs
Liga Portugal 2 clubs